The Dallas Elite Women's Football team is an American women's tackle football team playing in Division I of the Women's Football Alliance (WFA). The team, based in and around Dallas, Texas, was founded in 2014. The Dallas Elite reached the playoffs and national championship game three years in a row, 2015–2017. They defeated the Boston Renegades 31–21 at Highmark Stadium in Pittsburgh on July 22, 2017, to win the WFA Division I National Championship. Although they missed the playoffs in 2018 and 2019 (and the 2020 season was cancelled due to the global pandemic), the team earned a playoff berth in 2021.

The team rebranded as the Dallas Elite Mustangs in 2020. The 2021 Dallas Elite Mustangs are owned by Maria Spencer. The head coach is Coach Hamilton. The team plays home games at Alfred J. Loos Athletic Complex in Addison and Prestonwood Christian Academy in Plano.

Standings

2016 standings

2021 standings

References

Women's Football Alliance teams
2015 establishments in Texas
Women's sports in Texas
Sports teams in Dallas
American football teams established in 2015
Plano, Texas